Heidi K. Gardner is an American advisor and facilitator for businesses and organizations.  She is a Distinguished Fellow at Harvard Law School’s Center on the Legal Profession and former professor at Harvard Business School. She is the faculty chair and instructor of the Smarter Collaboration Master Class and Sector Leadership Master Class at Harvard Law School, and an instructor in multiple executive education programs at Harvard Business School.

Gardner has authored (or co-authored) more than 100 books, chapters, case studies, and articles. This includes Smart Collaboration: How Professionals and Their Firms Succeed by Breaking Down Silos and its successor Smarter Collaboration: A New Approach to Breaking Down Barriers and Transforming Work. Her research has been featured in major media outlets around the globe, including Harvard Business Review, The Economist, Time, Boston Globe, Fast Company, Chief Executive, The National Law Review, Financial Times, MSN.com, CNN Money, Fortune.com, and CBSNews.com.

Gardner has lived and worked on four continents, including as a Fulbright Fellow, and for McKinsey & Company and Procter & Gamble. She earned her BA in Japanese Studies from the University of Pennsylvania (Phi Beta Kappa, Summa Cum Laude), a master's degree from the London School of Economics, and a second master's and PhD from London Business School.

Books

Articles

References 

Living people
American legal writers
American legal scholars
Harvard Law School faculty
21st-century American women writers
American women non-fiction writers
21st-century American non-fiction writers
American women legal scholars
Year of birth missing (living people)
American women academics